USS Clarion River (LSM(R)-409) was an LSM(R)-401-class medium-type landing ship (LSM) built for the United States Navy during World War II. Named for the Clarion River in west central Pennsylvania, she was the only US Naval vessel to bear the name.

Service history

World War II
The ship was originally laid down on 26 January 1945 at the Charleston Navy Yard. Launched on 18 February 1945 and commissioned as USS LSM(R)-409 on 16 May 1945.

She was decommissioned on 6 February 1947 at San Diego, California and laid up in the Pacific Reserve Fleet.

Korean War
LSM(R)-409 was recommissioned on 5 October 1950 for Korean War service. She was assigned to LSMR Squadron Five and participated in the following campaigns: 
 Blockade of Wonsan (1951–1953)
 Communist China Spring Offensive (23 May–6 June 1951)
 UN Summer-Fall Offensive (15–30 July 1951 and 26 August–21 September 1951)
 Third Korean Winter (16–30 April 1953)
 Korean Summer-Fall (1 May–20 July 1953)

During her Korean War service, enemy aircraft attacked her in 1953, but did not damage her.

Renamed USS Clarion River (LSM(R)-409) on 1 October 1955, the ship was again decommissioned on 26 October of that year at Astoria, Oregon and laid up in the Pacific Reserve Fleet, Columbia River Group.

Vietnam
Clarion River was recommissioned on 18 September 1965 at the San Francisco Naval Shipyard, Hunters Point. Reclassified as an "Inshore Fire Support Ship" USS Clarion River (LFR-409) on 1 January 1969, she participated in the following campaigns: 
 Vietnamese Counteroffensive (26 May–4 June 1966 and 13–30 June 1966)
 Vietnamese Counteroffensive - Phase II (1–2 July, 13 July–4 August, 13–29 October, 12–23 November 1966 and 30 January–13 March 1967)
 Vietnamese Counteroffensive - Phase III (7 June–6 July, 23 July–17 August, and 26 October–20 November 1967 and 26 December 1967–18 January 1968)
 Tet Counteroffensive (3–25 February 1968)
 Vietnamese Counteroffensive - Phase V (8 July–13 August and 24 August–23 September 1968)
 Vietnamese Counteroffensive - Phase VI (3 November–7 December 1968)
 Tet 69/Counteroffensive (23 February–8 June 1969)
 Vietnam Summer-Fall 1969 (9 June–31 October 1969)
 Vietnam Winter-Spring 1970 (1 November 1969–30 April 1970)

Decommissioned for the last time on 8 May 1970 at Yokosuka, Japan and struck from the Naval Vessel Register (date unknown), she was sold for scrap in November 1970 to the Nissho-Iwai American Corporation of Sasebo, Japan.

Awards
Navy Unit Citation
Meritorious Unit Commendation
Combat Action Ribbon with gold star
World War II Victory Medal
National Defense Service Medal with star
Korean Service Medal with four battle stars
Vietnam Service Medal with nine campaign stars 
Korean Presidential Unit Citation
Republic of Vietnam Gallantry Cross
United Nations Korea Medal
Korean War Service Medal
Republic of Vietnam Campaign Medal

Image gallery

See also
 List of United States Navy LSMs

Notes

References

 
Muir, Malcolm, Jr. Sea Power on Call: Fleet Operations June 1951-July 1953. Washington, D.C.: Department of the Navy Naval Historical Center, 2005. .

External links
 ussclarionriver.wordpress.com/  The USS Clarion River LSMR - 409 NEW SITE LOCATION

 

Ships built in Charleston, South Carolina
LSM(R)-401-class medium landing ships
World War II amphibious warfare vessels of the United States
Korean War amphibious warfare vessels of the United States
1945 ships